Anthurium vittariifolium is a species of flowering plant in the family Araceae, native to the Amazon region; southeast Colombia, Ecuador, Peru, and northern Brazil. With its long, pendulous leaves it is occasionally sold as a houseplant.

References

vittariifolium
House plants
Flora of Colombia
Flora of Ecuador
Flora of Peru
Flora of North Brazil
Plants described in 1905